Sop Prap is a district (amphoe) in the southern part of Lampang province, northern Thailand.

History
The district was downgraded to a minor district (king amphoe) on 28 December 1917 and made a subordinate of Ko Kha district. It then consisted of the three tambons: Sop Prap, Samai, and Mae Kua. It was upgraded to a full district on 1 January 1953. Mr. Phayon Chanthanakhom was the first head officer of the district.

Etymology
The name Sop Prap comes from the Prap River, which joins the Wang River in the district. It is also a name to commemorate the courage of the people in the area, who defeated Burmese invaders.

Geography
Neighboring districts are (from the south clockwise): Thoen, Soem Ngam, Ko Kha, Mae Tha of Lampang Province and Wang Chin of Phrae province.

The important water resources are the Wang and Prap Rivers.

Administration
The district is divided into four subdistricts (tambons), which are further subdivided into 35 villages (mubans). Sop Prap is a township (thesaban tambon) which covers parts of tambon Sop Prap. There are a further four tambon administrative organizations (TAO).

References

External links
amphoe.com

Sop Prap